KCAW is a non-commercial radio station in Sitka, Alaska, on 104.7 FM, which airs public radio programming.  It first went on air in 1982.

History
KCAW first began daily broadcasts on the 6th of March 1982 after a sign-on broadcast on the 19th of February.  During the Sitka pulp mill years, Raven Radio News broadcast opposing perspectives to those of Alaska's national representatives on the issue of resource development.  The Anchorage Times, after at first defending resources developers, eventually investigated the issue and found that Raven Radio was presenting an overall unbiased account of Sitka's issues.

Original materials from KCAW have been contributed to the American Archive of Public Broadcasting.

Programming
KCAW is Sitka's only public radio station and offers a wide variety of programming. News for the station includes local news coming from Raven Radio's two paid reporters, Southeast Alaska news from CoastAlaska, statewide news from the Alaska Public Radio Network, national news from National Public Radio, and international news from the BBC World Service. KCAW also airs a variety of American Public Media and Public Radio International programming as well as its own variety of locally produced shows, including the critically acclaimed soul and funk show, "Powerful Love".

KCAW also syndicates Encounters, a nature and wildlife-themed show hosted by Richard Nelson, statewide.

Listening area
KCAW has a large listening area, by the means of translators, which include much of the western and northern portions of the Alaska Panhandle including Sitka, Angoon, Elfin Cove and the Fairweather fishing grounds, Kake, Pelican, Port Alexander, Tenakee Springs, and Yakutat. Raven Radio has roughly a 1,200-strong member base (listeners who donate money to the station).

Translators

See also
List of community radio stations in the United States

References

External links
 Official site
 

1982 establishments in Alaska
CAW
Community radio stations in the United States
NPR member stations
Public Radio International stations
Radio stations established in 1982
CAW
Sitka, Alaska